M'Bonoua is a village in south-eastern Ivory Coast. It is in the sub-prefecture of Anyama in the Autonomous District of Abidjan.

M'Bonoua was a commune until March 2012, when it became one of 1126 communes nationwide that were abolished.

Notes

Former communes of Ivory Coast
Populated places in Abidjan